Carex pandanophylla is a tussock-forming species of perennial sedge in the family Cyperaceae. It is native to Myanmar.

See also
List of Carex species

References

pandanophylla
Plants described in 1894
Taxa named by Charles Baron Clarke
Flora of Myanmar